Raymond Louis Buchanan (born September 29, 1971) is a former American football player in the NFL. He was drafted out of Louisville in 1993 by the Indianapolis Colts in the 3rd round (65th overall), and subsequently played for the Atlanta Falcons and the Oakland Raiders.

High school career
At Proviso East High School in Maywood, Illinois, Ray Buchanan was a four-year letterman in football as a running back and safety.  Buchanan was a state champion in two track and field events, the long jump and the triple jump.

Post-NFL Career

Musical career
Buchanan made a rap music album in 2002.

TV work
He works for Fox Sports Radio on the weekend and co-hosts alongside Bruce Jacobs.

References

1971 births
Living people
Players of American football from Chicago
American football safeties
American football cornerbacks
Louisville Cardinals football players
Indianapolis Colts players
Atlanta Falcons players
Oakland Raiders players
National Conference Pro Bowl players